The Second Severn Crossing, officially renamed the Prince of Wales Bridge since July 2018, is the M4 motorway bridge over the River Severn between England and Wales, opened in 1996 to supplement the traffic capacity of the Severn Bridge built in 1966. The bridge is operated by England's National Highways.

It is southwest of the Severn Bridge and because it is more closely in line with the rest of the M4, it reduces the length of the journey between England and Wales. The junctions at each end are designed for most traffic to use this crossing, and in order to use the old Severn Bridge, one has to leave the M4 at junction 21 and join the M48 near Aust or at junction 23 near Magor. The new crossing carries more traffic than the Severn Bridge, which is still in use. It is wider than the Severn Bridge, having three lanes and a narrow hard shoulder each way, compared to the two lanes, cycle path and narrow footpath of the original crossing. It is a cable-stayed bridge, whereas the Severn Bridge is a suspension bridge. The position of the bridge is close to that of the Severn Tunnel, which has carried the railway line beneath the river bed since 1886.

This presented the engineers with a constraint: packets of work were scheduled at low tide, and needed to be completed within the short windows allowed by the tides.

The concession given to the consortium which financed, built and operate the bridge required them to take over the outstanding debt on the original Severn Bridge and to operate the two bridges as a single entity. Tolls were set annually by the government based on the previous year's change in the Retail Price Index. On the expiry of the concession in January 2018, the consortium was required to hand the bridge over to public ownership. The tolls on both bridges were subsequently scrapped in December 2018.

Background 
The Severn Estuary presented a barrier between the Bristol area and South Wales. Much of the estuary is mud flats that are exposed at low tide; these have been designated a Special Protection Area. The central part of the estuary is a navigable channel which, at the site of the bridge, is known as "The Shoots". The bridge is upstream from Avonmouth and the Port of Bristol, but downstream from the Port of Sharpness. The Gloucester Harbour Trustees have responsibility for controlling navigation in the estuary's tidal waters upstream from the bridge.

Until 1966, road travellers could either use the Aust Ferry, which had operated since medieval times (and as a car ferry since 1926), or use the scheduled car shuttle train service through the Severn Tunnel between Pilning and Severn Tunnel Junction, which operated from 1926 until 1966. Otherwise, the detour via Gloucester would add  to the journey. In 1966, the first Severn road bridge, a four-lane suspension bridge, was opened, carrying the M4 motorway between England and South Wales. By 1984, traffic across the first Severn Bridge had tripled and it was projected that by the mid-1990s, the old bridge would be running at capacity. A study was commissioned into building either a second bridge or a tunnel. The consultants reported back in 1986, recommending that a new bridge be built downstream from the existing bridge.

In 1988, it was announced that tenders would be invited from private consortia to fund, build and operate the bridge for a specified period. The consortium would also take over the management of the old bridge and the associated £100 million debt. Tenders were invited in 1989; and in 1990 the concession to build the bridge was awarded to Severn River Crossing plc. Construction work started on 26 April 1992 and the bridge was opened by the then Prince of Wales, Charles III, on 5 June 1996.

Design 

The chief architect of the bridge was Ronald Weeks of the Cardiff-based Percy Thomas Partnership, with the detailed engineering design by the Halcrow Group and the French consultancy . The bridge has portals close to Sudbrook, Monmouthshire on the Welsh side and Severn Beach in South Gloucestershire on the English side. The approach viaducts are of a segmental bridge design. The crossing forms a very slight reverse "S" curve – the roadway has an approximate east–west alignment at each of the portals, while the central bridge follows an alignment approximately WNW to ESE.

The sides of the bridge are fitted with  baffle plates to reduce lateral wind loads coming from the Severn Estuary onto the traffic; this has reduced the number of times that speed restrictions have been needed. The overall design of the new crossing makes it more resistant to high winds than the old Severn Bridge.

Construction 

The crossing was built by a business consortium under a public-private partnership. A company called Severn River Crossing plc, led by John Laing plc and GTM-Entrepose, was formed to build the new crossing. This company also took over the responsibility of managing and maintaining the old Severn Bridge crossing, as well as managing and maintaining the new crossing. The cost of constructing the new crossing was to be paid for by tolls collected from motorists using the two crossings. Work on the new crossing began in 1992. Completion was in 1996.

Sub-assemblies for the bridge were constructed onshore and then shifted by a large tracked vehicle (similar to that used to move the Apollo and Space Shuttle at Cape Kennedy) onto a barge (the SAR3), prior to being floated out on the high tide to the site. The decking consists of  post-stressed match cast sections, weighing  each.

These were prefabricated on shore and put in place using balanced cantilever methods. Cable vibrations were experienced during construction and secondary cables were added to eliminate this. To avoid detracting from the aesthetics of the primary cables, the secondary cables are very slender and are not very noticeable.

During the summer of 1994 the bridge deck launching gantry fell onto the Gwent viaduct, causing the  bridge deck unit to fall onto the deck below. Although this delayed the project by ten weeks, the builders still completed the bridge on schedule two years later.

Environmental impact 

The crossing passes over mudflats in the Severn Estuary with part of the eastern approach viaduct sited on the English Stones, a rocky outcrop uncovered at low tide. The estuary wetlands are home to migrating birds such as the ringed plover, redshank and whimbrel, while the curlew, dunlin and grey plover winter in the area. The birds feed on ragworm, lugworm and other invertebrates. Saltmarsh is found along the fringes of the coast. Beds of eelgrass occur on the more sheltered mud- and sandbanks. In 1976, in recognition of the importance of the estuary as a wetland used by migrating birds, an area of 247 km2 (95 sq miles) was designated a Ramsar site. In 1988, the Severn Estuary was designated a Special Protection Area. The same year an area of 99 km2 (38 sq miles) was notified as a Site of Special Scientific Interest and designated as such the following year; in 1995, this was extended to cover the whole of the Ramsar site.

Prior to the bridge's construction, environmentalists raised numerous concerns and criticisms, chiefly about the immediate damage from construction work and the effects of long-term pollution from a projected increase in car traffic. The construction process resulted in a temporary increase in turbidity of the Severn waters. Although eelgrass is reasonably tolerant to short-term high turbidity and consequent loss of light, the bed of eelgrass in the river was observed to decline considerably during the period of construction. The construction of the approach roads and toll plaza resulted in the permanent loss of some wet pastureland.

Field surveys carried out in 2003 and 2004 reported that the bridge had little effect on the flight paths of the various birdsit was noted that when curlews, dunlins and lapwings approached the bridge, they would change course to gain height and fly over the bridge, but that oystercatchers and turnstones would fly under the bridge. The surveys also showed that the bridge had minimal impact on the roosting habits of most birds, though a flock of mallards were seen to be roosting directly under the bridge, with many positioning themselves on the dry concrete base on one of the pillars. Likewise, it was noted that the bridge had little impact on the birds' feeding habitsturnstones and lapwings were recorded as feeding on mudflats directly under the bridge while the absence of other waders was attributed to the rocky nature of the foreshore.

Finances 
The consortium consisting of two civil engineering firms and two banks that funded and built the bridge had a 30-year concession to redeem its outlay from tolls collected from users of the bridge. At the end of the concession period in January 2018, the bridge passed into public ownership, and is now managed by National Highways.

Tolls 

Tolls were collected from westbound traffic only, near Rogiet,  in Wales. Tolls charges were based on a three-tier pricing system: Tolls could be paid by cash, major credit or debit cards, or by use of the Severn TAG system, which was a wireless electronic toll collection system that did not require vehicles to stop.

Motorcycles and UK disabled badge holders travelling in a vehicle were exempted from paying a toll.
Toll prices were reviewed annually on 1 January, in accordance with the Severn Bridges Act 1992.
In late 2008, UK VAT was reduced from 17.5% to 15%, but the bridge toll remained unchanged. For convenience the tolls were kept at round multiples of 10p (the bridge toll was largely paid in cash as card payments were not accepted until mid-2012), but the 13p VAT reduction was not passed on immediately. In 2009, the planned toll for cars would have been £5.50, as the announcements listed, but the actual toll charged was £5.40. George Osborne, the then Chancellor of the Exchequer, announced in March 2015 that the tolls would be reduced to £5.40 in 2018, due to VAT being removed when the bridge comes into public ownership.

In the 2016 United Kingdom budget, Osborne announced that toll charges on the Severn crossings would be halved in 2018. The toll was due to be cut to £5.40 in 2017 but was increased.

It was reported in 2012 that the repayments were likely to continue until the early 2020s due to the introduction of a revised settlement to the operator in return for accepting payment by debit and credit cards. The announcement said that even after repayment was complete the toll charges would likely remain at the same levels. However, in July 2017 it was announced that the toll would be abolished,
In July 2017, the Welsh Secretary, Alun Cairns, announced that tolls would be scrapped at the end of 2018, claiming that this would boost the South Wales economy by around £100m a year. In September 2017, Cairns confirmed that tolls would be reduced in January 2018 as VAT is removed. As announced on 2 October 2018, tolls were abolished on 17 December 2018.

Historical toll charges 

The toll levied was always identical to that on the Severn Bridge.

Funding and ownership 
The bridge was built at a cost of £330 million (excluding VAT) and was owned by the company Severn River Crossing Plc.
35% John Laing, British developer infrastructure operator
35% Vinci, French concessions and construction company
15% Bank of America, American multinational banking and financial services corporation
15% Barclays Capital, British multinational investment bank

The company's 2011 annual report showed the same companies still owned, through subsidiary companies, all the issued ordinary share capital of the Plc.

In 2012, changes were made to the agreement to reflect the effect of changes in VAT and Corporation Tax and the costs of installing credit card handling systems. The net effect was to increase the required revenue from £995.83 million to £1,028.91 million in 1989 prices.

Ownership of the crossing and the original Severn Bridge returned to the UK government on 8 January 2018, when the project's required revenue, as defined in the Concession Agreement with the Secretary of State for Transport, had been collected. At that point, responsibility for operating the bridge passed to National Highways.

Closures 
On 6 February 2009, the bridge was closed by weather for the first time since its opening, after three vehicles were struck by falling ice, damaging windscreens. Bad weather, and again falling ice, repeated this in December 2009. Temporary speed limits are put in place due to high winds or thick fog, with drivers informed by the electronic signs. Because of the more advanced aerodynamic design of the later bridge, the Second Crossing is far less prone to such restrictions caused by crosswinds than the first Severn Bridge.

On 18 February 2022, both the Prince of Wales Bridge and the Severn Bridge were closed during Storm Eunice, due to high winds. It was the first time that the Prince of Wales Bridge had been closed because of winds.

Renaming 
On 5 April 2018, the Secretary of State for Wales, Alun Cairns, announced that the crossing would be renamed as the Prince of Wales Bridge at a ceremony later in the year. He said that the renaming would be "a fitting tribute to His Royal Highness in a year that sees him mark 60 years as The Prince of Wales and decades of continued, dedicated service to our nation".

An online petition, heavily shared via social media, against the renaming had received more than 30,000 signatures by 8 April. Some politicians criticised the proposed renaming and the lack of public consultation on it, but it was confirmed that the First Minister of Wales, Carwyn Jones, had raised no objection to the proposal. The bridge was formally renamed on 2 July 2018 where a plaque was unveiled by the Prince and the Duchess of Cornwall, which was followed by a reception for local dignitaries and business leaders at the nearby Celtic Manor Resort. There was no prior press release or other official communication from either the UK or Welsh Governments. The total cost for renaming the bridge, including the installation of two above road signs (and associated staffing costs to close the carriageways with and traffic diverted via the M48) along with the ceremony was £216,513.39.

See also 
List of bridges in Wales
List of crossings of the River Severn
Aust Severn Powerline Crossing

References 

Bridges across the River Severn
Bridges completed in 1996
Cable-stayed bridges in England
Bridges in Monmouthshire
Bridges in South Gloucestershire District
Motorway bridges in England
Motorway bridges in Wales
Landmarks in Wales
Former toll bridges in England
England–Wales border
Cable-stayed bridges in Wales
Viaducts in England
Viaducts in Wales
M4 motorway
1996 establishments in England
1996 establishments in Wales
Former toll bridges in Wales